Bilecik Province is a province in midwest Turkey, neighboring Bursa to the west, Kocaeli and Sakarya to the north, Bolu to the east, Eskişehir to the southeast and Kütahya to the south, spanning an area of 4,307 km2. The population is 228,334. Most of the province laid down in Marmara Region but eastern parts of Gölpazarı and Söğüt district and districts of İnhisar and Yenipazar remained in Black Sea Region, smaller southeastern parts of Bozüyük and Söğüt remained in Central Anatolia Region and smaller southwestern part of Bozüyük remained in Aegean Region.

History 
The region was inhabited as early as 3000 BC, and was part of the territory controlled by such notable civilizations as the Hittites (1400–1200 BC), the Phrygians (1200–676 BC), Lydians (595–546 BC), Persians (546–334 BC), Romans (74–395 AD) and Byzantians (395 AD to late 13th century, with two brief occupations by Umayyads in between).

The region also contains Söğüt, the small town where the Ottoman Empire was founded in 1299, and is the source of important archeological as well as cultural artifacts.

Geography 
Bilecik Province contains wide array of geographical and climatic zones in its borders. The province is dominated by hills and deep valleys. The western end of the Anatolian Plateau is also located in the province. Sakarya River and Karasu are the most important rivers in the province.

Districts

Bilecik province is divided into 8 districts (capital district in bold):
 Bilecik
 Bozüyük
 Gölpazarı
 İnhisar
 Osmaneli
 Pazaryeri
 Söğüt
 Yenipazar

Demographics

Sites of interest
In Söğüt a site of interest is the Ethnographical Museum.

The town Bilecik is famous for its numerous restored Turkish houses.

Some other sites of interest in the province are: Osman Gazi and Orhan Gazi mosques, Seyh Edebali and Mal Hatun mausoleums, Köprülü Mehmet Pasha mosque, Köprülü Caravanserai, Kaplikaya tombs, Rüstem Pasha mosque, and Gülalan Pavilion.

Gallery

See also

 List of populated places in Bilecik Province

References

External links

  Bilecik governor's official website
  Bilecik municipality's official website
 Bilecik weather forecast information
  Yerel Yöneylem Kalkınma Derneği - Gölpazarı
  Bayırköy's local website
  Virtual platform of Bilecik 
  Bilecik hayat platform